Sambir is a city in Sambir Raion, Lviv Oblast, Ukraine. It serves as the administrative center of Sambir Raion (district) and is located close to the border with Poland. Sambir hosts the administration of Sambir urban hromada, one of the hromadas of Ukraine. Population:

Location
Sambir is situated on the left bank of the Dniester river. The city stands at the crossroads. It is the cultural, industrial and tourist center of modern Ukraine.

The fifth largest city in Lviv Oblast. Distance to the regional center by rail for 78 miles, by road 76 km length of the city from the South-West to North-East is 10.5 km, and from North-West to South-East 4.5 km from the hotel. The area is 24 km2.
The center is located at the height of 305,96 m above sea level.

The city is an important road connecting Eastern and Western Europe, North and South. Through Sambor electrified railway tracks, trunk pipelines and power lines.

History
The history of the cities Sambir and Staryi Sambir, which are both situated in Halychyna (which is now part of Ukraine), in Lviv Oblast by the Dnister river, begins in a place currently known as Staryi Sambir ("Old Sambir"). This was founded in the 12th century and served as an important center of the Halych Princedom. In the 13th century, the Tatars destroyed it, and in the year 1241 it was burnt down.

Part of the Stariy Sambir population, especially the weavers, moved to a village called Pohonich, at a distance of some twelve kilometers from the old town, and it was called Novyi Sambor (New Sambor) to distinguish it from old Sambor. The latter began to be called Staryi-Sambor, or the old city. The village of Pohonicz was first under the rule of Rus; in 1340 became part of the Kingdom of Poland.

The foundations of the future city of Sambir were laid in 1390 by the voivode of Kraków, Spytek of Melsztyn, a companion and adviser to the Polish king Władysław II Jagiełło (1396–1434) in his war expeditions. The king granted his loyal companion, for his military services, enormous pieces of land, from Dobromyl to Stryi. Spytek (also Spytko), evaluating the importance of Pohonicz, left a document dated 13 December 1390 addressed to the Wojt (Mukhtar), Henrik from Landshut, permitting him to establish a city in Pohonicz to be called Novyi-Sambor, granting it the rights of Magdeburg.

It is not possible to determine exactly when the village of Pohonicz was founded because of the lack of historical sources. It may be assumed that, it being on the important commercial and strategic crossroads near the Dniester and its tributary Mlinuvka, it served as a worth center for fortification and defense. Despite the fact that the village of Pohonicz was raised to the status of a city and its name changed to Novi-Sambor, we find in official documents up to the year 1450 that the city was called by two names: Sambor or Novi-Sambor, formerly Pohonicz.

Sambir is situated on what is almost an island formed between two parallel rivers, the one distant from the other by a few kilometers – the Dniester on one side and the Strwiaz on the other – which come together after Sambir in the vicinity of Dolubova. In the pre-historic period the Dniester, at a distance of about three kilometers from Sambor, created a special kind of tributary called Mlinuvka, which, separating completely from the Dniester, falls into the river Strwionz. The Dniester and the Mlinuvka add a natural charm to Sambor. The grant of municipal rights led to people flocking to the city – Poles, Germans, Russians and Jews.

From the city's founding, Spytko saw to its development and granted it many rights. In January 1394, King Wladyslaw Jagiello, at Spytko's request, exempted the inhabitants from paying various taxes. Not for very long, however, did Sambor benefit from his actions for the good of the city. In 1399 Spytko participated in the war against the Tatars, in which he was killed on 12 August 1399 near the river Worskla (see: Battle of the Vorskla River). After his death, the Sambor properties passed to his wife, Elzbieta Melsztynska.

In the earliest times, Sambir had natural conditions for development of commerce, lying as it did on the important commercial route where the Baltic Sea, through the river San, and the Black Sea, through the river Dniester, are connected. The Dniester had already played an important role as a natural water route leading to Akerman near the Black Sea. From there, the Greek merchants reached the land of Scythia with their products. Through Sambor, an important dry land route also led to Hungary, and by this passage to the borders of Poland, merchandise was brought such as timber, salt, cattle, fox and bear skins, honey, and from Hungary, particularly wines. The Sambor merchants would purchase from the Hungarian merchants wines, horses, leather, cloth and various fruits.

From Sambir there was also a road to Lviv through Rudki and Komarno, which connected it with the commercial center of goods from the east, making Sambor an important commercial juncture.

Sambir was rebuilt several times. In 1498, when Poland was attacked by the Turks and the Tatars, it was burnt down completely. And before the population had recovered from this disaster, the city was threatened, in 1515, by an invasion by the Tatars. 
In the 16th century, a new Sambor was established on the ruins of the burnt-out wooden houses.

In 1530, in view of all the invasions and attacks on the city, the Starosta (district governor) Krzysztof Odrowaz Szydlowski surrounded it with a thick wall and deep trenches, to enable it to be defended. For two hundred and fifty years, Sambor, thus enclosed, was compelled to shrink, limiting itself to narrow streets, without any possibility of expanding and developing naturally. The city was frozen into restricting borders until the first years of the Austrian conquest in 1772 (see: Partitions of Poland).

The city's walls, gates and towers were of much concern to the city fathers, who imposed heavy taxes on the population to cover the costs of safeguarding them for defense. Furthermore, each of the eleven artisans' guilds in the city had to take upon itself the obligation to guard and defend a certain part of the wall, as well as provide arms at its own expense.

In the center of the market place stood Ratusz (City Hall), with a clock tower on it. This building, the most important in the rebuilt city, was entirely destroyed in 1637 in a fire that wiped out almost all of Sambor. The new Ratusz was completed only in 1668, and then, for the first time, at the top of the tower the city emblem was unfurled: a deer with an arrow in its throat.

The Royal Palace
Second in importance for defense was the royal palace, which was situated outside the city walls, in the suburb of Blich. At first it was built of wood and was burnt down in 1498. When the Starosta Shidlovski rebuilt it in 1530, near the Dniester, he built it as a fortress, surrounded by moats, behind which were earthen walls. 
In the royal palace, which was the seat of the Starosta, there was, besides the service workers numbering sixty-five in 1569, a garrison composed of infantry and cavalry. This army was intended not only to protect the palace, but also to safeguard the peace and security of Sambor and the vicinity. Furthermore, it was needed to stamp out gangs which would infiltrate from Hungary and spread panic in the neighborhood.

The royal palace of Sambor had the honor to host within it almost all the kings of Poland and heads of state; many splendid receptions were held there with the participation of the city's notables.

Church of Nativity of the Theotokos

Church of Nativity of the Theotokos in Sambir built of wood in the late 1570s, in the town of Sambir, (in the Polish–Lithuanian Commonwealth), commissioned by the Ruthenians, Queen of Poland and Grand Duchess of Lithuania Bona.  This decision provoked protests and complaints in a multi-confessional environment of the community of Sambir. However, the "dispute was successfully resolved in favor of the Lord" and a wooden The Church of Nativity of the Theotokos was built, which served until 1738, when it was rebuilt in stone.

The stone church, preserved with minor rearrangements and side-chapels (see photo) was built in 1738. Funds for its construction and design were donated by a wealthy family of Galician nobles, the Komarnickis.

The architectural lines of the building have a simple and clear form. On the facade, a balcony and loft house statues of guardian angels. Inside, there is a painting by the artist-painter Yablonski.

Jewish community

There were around 8,000 Jews living in the town of Sambor in 1939, predominantly in the city-centre. There was a Jewish school and a synagogue. The Jews were merchants, craftsmen and artisans.

The German occupation of Sambor began on June 30, 1941. In March 1942, an open ghetto was established in the village. In May, there were around 6,500 Jews in the ghetto because a lot of Jews had managed to flee before the German occupation. Between August and October 1942, there were four Jewish actions carried out in the village. The first action took place on August 4, 1942. A selection was organized in the stadium by the German gendarmerie, Ukrainian police and a team of the Security police. 150 Jews were murdered. On August 6, these  Jews were transferred to Lviv. Other Jews were brought to the camp. During this action which lasted three days, 4,000 Jews were shot.

The second action took place on September 25–26, 1942. The Jewish Council selected 300 Jews who were shot in the forest of Ralivka, also called Radlowicze.

On October 17–18 and 22, 1942, a third and then fourth action was perpetrated by the German gendarmerie, Schutzpolizei, and the Ukrainian police. Jews were collected from the jail and from nearby villages.

During the third action, 1,000 Jews were sent to Belzec extermination camp and during the fourth action, 460 Jews were sent to Belzec. During the four actions which were perpetrated from August to October 1942, 5000 Jews were sent from Sambir to Belzec. The open ghetto became a closed ghetto in December 1942. Several actions took place in the ghetto from February to June 1943. During the first action, on February 13, 1943, 500 Jews were executed in the forest of Ralivka. On April 14, 1943, a second action was carried out during which 1,200 Jews were selected and 900 were shot in the cemetery.

On May 20–22, 1943, a third ghetto action was carried out and several hundreds of Jews “incapable of working” were shot in the forest of Ralivka. The liquidation of the ghetto took place on June 5, 1943 and 1,000 Jews were shot in the forest of Ralivka.

There were about 160 Jewish survivors, many of them hidden by local farmers, both Poles and Ukrainians.

Independent Ukraine
Until 18 July 2020, Sambir was incorporated as a city of oblast significance and served as the administrative center of Sambir Raion though it did not belong to the raion. In July 2020, as part of the administrative reform of Ukraine, which reduced the number of raions of Lviv Oblast to seven, the city of Sambir was merged into Sambir Raion.

Today the 704th Detached Regiment of Radiological, Chemical, and Biological Protection of the Ukrainian Armed Forces is located in the town.

Climate
There is a fairly mild winter, with thaws, sometimes without snow cover (for winter precipitation typical minimum amount per year, although they are in the form of rain and snow falls often), in Sambor. Spring is long, sometimes lengthy, windy, cool, and very wet. Summer is warm, hot, a little wet and a little rainy.
Autumn is warm, sunny and dry (usually lasts until the first of November). The winter 2013-2014 was extremely warm. Also, the snow cover at all this month was observed.

Time zone
In Sambir and throughout Ukraine there's one time zone: the official Kyiv time. Every year there is a transition to summer and winter time on the last Sunday of March at 3:00, which is 1 hour ahead and the last Sunday of October at 4:00 on 1 hour ago.

International relations

Twin towns — Sister cities
Sambir is twinned with:
 Sloviansk; 
 Brzozów;
 Kostrzyn nad Odrą;
 Oświęcim;
 Breisach am Rhein
 Kerpen
 Küstriner Vorland

Notable people
 Wladyslaw Abraham (1860 - 1941) - Polish lawyer and scientist, father of Roman Abraham,
 Wiktor Biegański (1892 – 1974) - Polish actor, film director and screenwriter,
 Valeriy Borzov (born 1949) - Ukrainian sprint athlete,
 Wladyslaw Byrka (1878 - 1945) - Polish lawyer, economist and politician. Chairman of PKO Bank Polski, deputy speaker of the Sejm,
 Ernst Eichel (1907 - ca. 1956) - violinist, as a conductor assumed the name of 'Ernest Borsamsky',
 Maria Wanda Jastrzębska (1924 – 1988) Polish electronics engineer and academic
 Stefan Kaczmarz (1895 - 1939) - Polish mathematician
 Mykola Kolessa (1903 - 2006) - Ukrainian composer
 Petro Konashevych-Sahaidachny
 Les Kurbas (1887–1937) - Ukrainian movie and theater director
 Henry Lehrman (1881–1946) - motion picture director
 Juliusz Makarewicz (1872 - 1955) - senator in the Second Polish Republic, legal expert, professor of Lwow University
Tadeusz Pankiewicz (1908 - 1993) - Polish Pharmacist - Holocaust Rescue - awarded recognition as a "Righteous Among the Nations" for his wartime activities in rescuing Jews
 Jozef Skowyra (born 1941) - Polish politician, deputy to the Sejm
 Eduard Steuermann (1892 - 1964) - pianist, pupil of Ferruccio Busoni
 Zygmunt Steuermann (1899–1941), football player
 Kasper Twardowski (1583 - 1641) - Polish poet
 Salka Viertel (1889-1978) - Hollywood screenwriter and memoirist.

References

External links

 Sambor in Geographical Dictionary of the Kingdom of Poland (1889) 
 Sambor history
 Sambor history and photos (in Polish)
 The Book of Sambor and Stari Sambor; a Memorial to the Jewish Communities
 

 
Cities in Lviv Oblast
Kingdom of Galicia and Lodomeria
Lwów Voivodeship
Ruthenian Voivodeship
Shtetls
Cities of regional significance in Ukraine
Populated places on the Dniester River in Ukraine
Sambir Raion
History of Lviv Oblast
Holocaust locations in Ukraine